Ragnvald, Rögnvald or Rognvald or Rægnald is an Old Norse name (Old Norse Rǫgnvaldr, modern Icelandic Rögnvaldur; in Old English Regenweald and in Old Irish, Middle Irish Ragnall). Notable people with the name include:

 Ragnvald Heidumhære (9th century), King of Vestfold
 Rognvald Eysteinsson (fl. late 9th century), Jarl of Møre
 Ragnall ua Ímair (died 921), King of York
 Ragnall Guthfrithson, co-King of York, 943-44
 Ragnall mac Gofraid (died 1004/1005), King of the Isles
 Rogvolod (mid-10th century), Prince of Polotsk
 Ragnvald Ingvarsson (10th century), officer of the Varangian Guard
 Ragnvald Ulfsson the Old, jarl of Vastergotland and possibly father of King Stenkil of Sweden
 Rognvald Brusason (died c. 1046), Jarl of Orkney
 Ragnvald Ingesson (late 11th century), only known son and heir of King Inge I of Sweden
 Ragnvald Knaphövde (early 12th century), King of Sweden
 Rögnvald Kali Kolsson (12th century), Norwegian saint and jarl of part of Orkney
 Ragnall mac Somairle (12th century), Hebridean magnate
 Rögnvaldr Óláfsson (fl. 1164) of the Isle of Man (ruled 1164)
 Rǫgnvaldr Guðrøðarson (died 1229), King of the Isles
 Rögnvaldr Óláfsson (d. 1249) of the Isle of Man (ruled 1249)

Norwegian masculine given names